Arthur Whitelock Lemon (15 April 1905 – 28 May 1982) was a Welsh international number 8 who played club rugby for Neath and was capped 13 times for Wales, then later switched codes to play rugby league for St Helens when he found that he had been dropped from the Wales team.

International rugby career
Lemon made his international debut for Wales in a game against Ireland on 9 March 1929 under the captaincy of Guy Morgan. Wales drew the game, which handed the Championship to Scotland. Although Lemon missed the opening game of the 1930 Five Nations Championship against England, he was reselected for the remaining three games. Lemon played in all four games of the 1931 tournament, which saw Wales win the Championship for the first time in eight years. Lemon was next selected to play against the 1931 touring South Africans. It was a terrible spectacle played on an icy pitch, that Wales captain Jack Bassett failed to adapt his teams play to. After playing out the entirety of the 1932 Championship, Lemon would play one final match for Wales against Ireland in 1933. When Wales lost the game, the selectors decided on wholesale change and Lemon was amongst 11 players to be dropped.

Rugby League career
On being dropped by Wales, Lemon chose to turn professional with St Helens. He played for one season, then was sold to Streatham and Mitcham R.L.F.C. when Saints were in financial difficulty.

International matches played
Wales
  1931, 1932
  1930, 1931
 Ireland  1929, 1930, 1931, 1932, 1933
  1930, 1931, 1932
  1931

Bibliography

References

1905 births
1982 deaths
Footballers who switched code
Neath RFC players
Rugby league players from Neath
Rugby union number eights
Rugby union players from Neath
St Helens R.F.C. players
Streatham and Mitcham R.L.F.C. players
Wales international rugby union players
Welsh rugby league players
Welsh rugby union players